Cystolepiota seminuda is an inedible, common mushroom of the genus Cystolepiota. It can be found on humus, often along forest roads.

Description
The cap is convex to bell shaped; white, evenly grainy, often with a fringed margin and up to 2 cm in diameter. The gills are white and crowded, with white spores.
The stem is white, turning slightly purple when bruised, flaky and grainy.

References
E. Garnweidner. Mushrooms and Toadstools of Britain and Europe. Collins. 1994.

External links
 
 

Agaricaceae
Fungi of Europe
Fungi described in 1976